The Australian Mixed Doubles Curling Championship is the national curling championship for mixed doubles curling in Australia. The winners of the tournament will represent Australia at the World Mixed Doubles Curling Championship. Event organizer is Australian Curling Federation.

Champions and medalists 
The past champions and medalists of the event are listed as follows:

References

See also

 Australian Men's Curling Championship
 Australian Women's Curling Championship
 Australian Mixed Curling Championship

  
Recurring sporting events established in 2007
2007 establishments in Australia
Curling competitions in Australia
Australia